Pterula subulata is a species of mushroom producing fungus in the family Pterulaceae. It has the common name angel hair coral.

Taxonomy 
It was first described in 1829 by the Swedish mycologist Elias Magnus Fries who classified it as Anthina (Pterula) subulata awaiting the publication of his 1830 text which would formally move it to Pterula subulata.

In 1846 the French mycologist Joseph-Henri Léveillé classified it as Merisma subulatum however this change was not adopted and the current name remains Pterula subulata.

Description 
Pterula subulata is a small whitish coral fungus with a delicate branching structure.

Fruit body: 3-6mm thin, hairlike coral that branches repeatedly towards the smooth and shiny pointed tips. The colour is white to off white to light brown with the tips having a lighter colour than the base.  Stem: 1-2mm when present but sometimes absent. Flesh: White. Tough and rubbery. Spore print: White. Spores: Ellipsoid and smooth. 5-6 x 2.5-3.5μm. Taste: Indistinct. Smell: Indistinct.

Habitat and distribution 
This species is not commonly recorded in the United Kingdom but has been found in Bedfordshire, Cambridgeshire and South Somerset and was observed growing on soil in damp woodland.

It is found on soil in damp woodland where it grows solitary or in small trooping groups probably all through the year.

, GBIF has fewer than 200 recorded observations for this species with most being from Europe. However many of these observations are from iNaturalist and other citizen science platforms so may not be verified and could have been mistaken for another Pterula species.

Etymology 
The specific epithet subulata derives from the Latin subulatus meaning awl or needle shaped.

Similar species 

 Pterula multifida is described very similarly.

References 

Pterulaceae
Fungi described in 1830
Fungi of Europe